Benedict is an unincorporated community in Polk County, in the U.S. state of Georgia.

History
This unincorporated community was named for George Elliot Benedict, a local Episcopal priest.

References

Unincorporated communities in Polk County, Georgia
Unincorporated communities in Georgia (U.S. state)